Gisors is a commune of Normandy, France.

Gisors, together with the neighbouring communes of Trie-Château and Trie-la-Ville, form an urban area of 13,915 inhabitants (2018). This urban area is a satellite town of Paris.

Geography
Gisors is located in the Vexin normand region of Normandy, at the confluence of the rivers Epte, Troesne and Réveillon.

Population

Transport
The Gisors station is the terminus of a Transilien suburban rail service from the Paris Saint-Lazare station, and of a TER Normandie local service to Serqueux.

Sights
Château de Gisors, built in the 11th century.
The Saint-Gervais-Saint-Protais parish church is an outstanding monument fusing Gothic and Renaissance architecture.
A field near Gisors was the site of the Cutting of the elm, a medieval diplomatic incident.

See also
Communes of the Eure department

References

External links

Official site
Gazetteer Entry

Communes of Eure